Ardee is a town in Ireland.

Ardee may also refer to:

 Ardee (barony)
 Ardee (Parliament of Ireland constituency)
 SS Ardee, a steamship
 Ardee, Tennessee, a ghost town in the United States
 ArrDee, a British rapper